James Will (born 7 October 1972) is a Scottish former professional football goalkeeper, who played for Arsenal, Dunfermline Athletic, Turriff United, Deveronvale and Peterhead.

Will played for Scotland youth national teams. He was the first choice goalkeeper as Scotland progressed to the final of the 1989 FIFA U-16 World Championship, which they lost on a penalty shootout to Saudi Arabia. Will won the player of the tournament award, having only conceded three goals in the competition. He later made three appearances for the Scotland under-21 team.

After leaving professional football,  Will became a police officer in the Grampian force area.

References

External links

1972 births
Living people
Footballers from Aberdeenshire
Association football goalkeepers
Scottish footballers
Scotland youth international footballers
Arsenal F.C. players
Dunfermline Athletic F.C. players
Turriff United F.C. players
Peterhead F.C. players
Scottish Football League players
Deveronvale F.C. players
Scotland under-21 international footballers
Sheffield United F.C. players